Nueva California is a corregimiento in Tierras Altas District, Chiriquí Province, Panama. It was established by Law 55 of September 13, 2013.

References

Corregimientos of Chiriquí Province